Dirty Work is a 1987 novel by New Zealand author Nigel Cox.

Cox's second novel (after his debut, Waiting for Einstein), Dirty Work is set in Wellington City, New Zealand, in the mid-1980s. The book revolves around the lives of staff and guests in the Happy World, a low-rent hotel, and the conflict between the hotel owner, Hendrick van Eesen ('Hendy'), and his newly hired shift manager, Gina Tully.

The novel won the Bucklands Memorial Literary Prize shortly after its release, and was also optioned for film.

In 2006, the book was re-published by Victoria University Press, based in  Wellington.

Trivia 

A manuscript written by one of the book's main characters, entitled "Tarzan of the Apes", has a plotline closely resembling that of Cox's fourth novel, Tarzan Presley, published in 2002.

Bibliography 

Nigel Cox, Dirty Work, Victoria University Press: Wellington, NZ, 2006.

External links 
Victoria University Press Official publishers' website.

20th-century New Zealand novels
1987 novels
Novels set in New Zealand
Novels set in hotels
Wellington in fiction